Trichosurolaelaps is a genus of mites in the family Hirstionyssidae. The small macropod species Hypsiprymnodon moschatus, the musky rat kangaroo, is recorded as a host to species of this mite.

The following is a list of species names, 
 Trichosurolaelaps crassipes Womersley, 1956
 Trichosurolaelaps dixous Domrow, 1972
 Trichosurolaelaps fallax Domrow, 1972
 Trichosurolaelaps harrisoni Domrow, 1961
 Trichosurolaelaps marra Domrow, 1972
 Trichosurolaelaps striatus Domrow, 1958

References

Mesostigmata